Bluff is a 1924 American silent drama film directed by Sam Wood and written by Willis Goldbeck, Josephine Quirk, and Rita Weiman. The film stars Agnes Ayres, Antonio Moreno, Fred J. Butler, Clarence Burton, Pauline Paquette, and Jack Gardner. The film was released on May 12, 1924, by Paramount Pictures.

Plot
As described in a film magazine review, Betty Hallowell is an unsuccessful fashion designer as the New York City modistes spurn her work as being that of a nobody. Her brother Jack is crippled in an accident involving political boss Mitchell's automobile. The latter swears vengeance on Betty when she refuses the slim compromise he offers. Broke, Betty realizes that you must bluff in order to win prestige in Gotham, so she impersonates Nina Loring, a missing international beauty, and the New York City modistes flock to buy her designs. However, the real Nina is wanted for embezzlement. Mitchell's secretary is about to have Betty arrested. She is saved by Robert Fitzmaurice, a young lawyer, who threatens to expose Mitchell's crookedness and, by bluffing, causes him to back down. As a result, Robert wins Betty's affection.

Cast

Preservation
The film has survived and is preserved in a nitrate print in the Library of Congress collection and another print is listed as being held by UCLA Film and Television Archive.

References

External links

Advertising for the film outside a theatre
Still at silenthollywood.com

1924 films
1920s English-language films
Silent American drama films
1924 drama films
Paramount Pictures films
Films directed by Sam Wood
American black-and-white films
American silent feature films
1920s American films